Colin Blackshear (born; December 6, 1979) is an American filmmaker and multi-media artist.  He is a film producer, director and editor.

Early life and career
Blackshear was born in Berkeley, California in 1979 and currently lives in Northern California.

Later work
Blackshear film director and film producer the short film "Second Nature", created for Sector 9 Skateboards.  Second Nature has won several awards including "Best Extreme Sports Film" at the Mammoth Film Festival, "Best Short Film" at the X-Dance Action Sports Film Festival,"Best Sports Film" at the Sonoma International Film Festival and Best Adventure Sport film at The 5 Point Film Festival in Carbondale, Colorado. Working in collaboration with photographer and filmmaker Ari Marcopoulos, he co-created an internet video titled "Claremont" for fashion designer Adam Kimmel, and was editor on the project, "No Way Back", created for the Yves Saint Laurent. Blackshear holds a Bachelor of Fine Arts degree from California College of the Arts in Oakland/San Francisco, California in Media Arts. Blackshear has also worked with other filmmakers Caveh Zahedi, Sam Green, Daria Martin, Aaron Brown, and Rob Epstein.

References

External links
Colin Blackshear – official site

Living people
1979 births
People from Berkeley, California
American film directors